The national emblem of the Mari Autonomous Soviet Socialist Republic was adopted in 1937 by the government of the Mari Autonomous Soviet Socialist Republic. The emblem is identical to the emblem of the Russian Soviet Federative Socialist Republic.

History 
The emblem of the Mari ASSR was identical to the emblem of the RSFSR with the addition of the corresponding inscriptions in the Mari language. The name of the republic in the national language had the form: "Марийский АССР", and the motto: "Чыла элласе пролетарий-шамыч, ушныза!". This was confirmed in the Article 111 of the 1937 Constitution of the Mari ASSR, which was adopted in 21 July 1937.

First revision 
In 1972, the motto on the emblem changed. The motto on the emblem changed to "ЧЫЛА ЭЛЫСЕ ПРОЛЕТАРИЙ-ВЛАК УШНЫЗА!".

Second revision 
The Extraordinary IX Session of the Supreme Council of the 9th Supreme Soviet of the Mari ASSR on May 30, 1978 adopted a new Constitution of the republic. The description of the emblem was amended, with a red star added. This was confirmed by the Regulations on the State Emblem of the Mari ASSR, which were approved by the Decree of the Presidium of the Supreme Council of the Mari ASSR on August 21, 1981.

The inscription of the emblem underwent a minor change, and was changed to "ЧЫЛА ЭЛЛАСЕ ПРОЛЕТАРИЙ-ВЛАК УШНЫЗА!".

Gallery

References 

Mari Autonomous Soviet Socialist Republic
Mari ASSR
Mari ASSR
Mari ASSR
Mari ASSR
Mari ASSR